Winners of the West is a 1940 American Western film serial from Universal Pictures directed by Ford Beebe and Ray Taylor. It stars Dick Foran and Anne Nagel in a plot about the construction of a railroad and a local ganglord who opposes it. It was Universal's 115th serial release (the 47th with sound).

The studio had used the name for an earlier silent serial but there are no plot similarities between the two versions. Columbia's Roar of the Iron Horse is very similar to this serial, however, and the writer George H. Plympton worked on both.

Plot
The Southwest Central Railroad Company is attempting to build a railroad through "Hell's Gate Pass". However, King Carter, the self-appointed ruler of the land beyond the pass, does not want this to happen. He sends henchmen, including local Indians, to disrupt the construction anyway they can, from sabotage to kidnapping Claire Hartford, the daughter of the company President. The President's assistant, Jeff Ramsay, and his sidekicks, stop King Carter's schemes at every point and eventually defeat him entirely. This opens the area up to new settlers, the first of which is Jeff himself and his new wife Claire.

Cast
Dick Foran as Jeff Ramsay, employee of the Hartford Transcontinental Railroad
Anne Nagel as Claire Hartford, daughter of John Hartford
Tom Fadden as Tex Houston, scout and one of Jeff Ramsay's sidekicks
James Craig as Jim Jackson, another of Jeff Ramsay's sidekicks
Harry Woods as King Carter, villain
Charles Stevens as Snakeye, King Carter's lead henchman
Edward Keane as John Hartford, President of the Hartford Transcontinental Railroad
Trevor Bardette as Raven, one of King Carter's henchmen
Edgar Edwards as Tim, one of King Carter's henchmen
Edmund Cobb as Maddox, one of King Carter's henchmen
William Desmond as Bill Brine, Railroad foreman
Roy Barcroft as Logan, one of King Carter's henchmen

Production

Stunts
Cliff Lyons, riding double for Dick Foran (Jeff Ramsay) and Tom Fadden (Tex Houston)
Eddie Parker, fight double for Dick Foran (Jeff Ramsay)
Fred Graham, doubling Harry Woods (King Carter)
Kermit Maynard
Ken Terrell
Henry Wills

Chapter titles

 
 2: The Wreck at Red River Gorge
 3: The Bridge of Disaster
 
 
 
 

 
 
 
 
 
 

1. Redskins Ride Again
2. Wreck At Red River Gorge
3. Bridge Of Disaster
4. Trapped By Redskins
5. Death Strikes The Trail
6. A Leap For Life 
7. Thundering Terror
8. Flaming Arsenal 
9.Sacrificed By Savages
10.Under Crashing Timbers
11.Bullets In The Dark
12.Battle Of Blackhawk
13.Barricades Blasted

Source for chapter names:

See also
List of film serials
List of film serials by studio

References

External links

1940 films
American black-and-white films
1940s English-language films
Films directed by Ford Beebe
Films directed by Ray Taylor
Universal Pictures film serials
1940 Western (genre) films
American Western (genre) films
Films scored by Hans J. Salter
Films with screenplays by George H. Plympton
1940s American films